Jacques Urbain is a Belgian scientist, and professor at the Université libre de Bruxelles. In 1987, he was awarded the Francqui Prize on Biological and Medical Sciences for his work on immunology.

External links
Jacques Urbain

Belgian immunologists
Academic staff of the Université libre de Bruxelles
Living people
Year of birth missing (living people)
Place of birth missing (living people)
20th-century Belgian scientists